André Cloarec (31 July 1937 – 18 December 1998) was a French racing cyclist. He rode in the 1961 Tour de France.

References

1937 births
1998 deaths
French male cyclists
Place of birth missing